Strâmba may refer to the following rivers in Romania:

 Strâmba, a village in the commune Josenii Bârgăului, Bistrița-Năsăud County
 Strâmba, tributary of the Amaradia in Gorj County
 Strâmba, tributary of the Dorofei in Olt County
 Strâmba, tributary of the Ilișua in Bistrița-Năsăud County
 Strâmba, tributary of the Ilva in Bistrița-Năsăud County
 Strâmba, tributary of the Lepșa in Vrancea County
 Strâmba (Mureș), tributary of the Mureș in Harghita County
 Strâmba, tributary of the Cornet in Timiș County
 Strâmba, tributary of the Olt in Sibiu County
 Strâmba, tributary of the Printre Văi in Sălaj County
 Strâmba, tributary of the Râușor in Argeș County
 Strâmba, tributary of the Sălăuța in Bistrița-Năsăud County
 Strâmba, tributary of the Sebeș in Sibiu County
 Strâmba, tributary of the Șercaia in Brașov County
 Strâmba, tributary of the Suciu in Maramureș County
 Strâmba, tributary of the Tazlău in Bacău County
 Strâmba, tributary of the Tismana in Gorj County
 Strâmba, tributary of the Tur in Satu Mare County

See also 
 Strâmbu (disambiguation)
 Valea Strâmbă (disambiguation)